The following outline is provided as an overview of and topical guide to Serbia:

Serbia – landlocked sovereign country located in Southeastern Europe and comprising the southern portion of the Pannonian Plain and a central portion of the Balkan Peninsula. Serbia is bordered by Hungary to the north; Romania and Bulgaria to the east; North Macedonia and constitutionally only, Albania (via Kosovo, a disputed territory over which Serbia has no control, thus no direct access to Albania) to the south; and Croatia, Bosnia and Herzegovina and Montenegro to the west. The capital of Serbia is Belgrade.

For centuries, shaped at cultural boundaries between East and West, a powerful medieval kingdom – later renamed the Serbian Empire – occupied much of the Balkans. Torn by domestic feuds, Ottoman, Hungarian, and later, Austrian incursions, the Serbian state collapsed by the mid-16th century. The positive outcome of the Serbian revolution in 1817 marked the birth of modern Serbia. Within a century it reacquired Kosovo, Raška and Vardar Macedonia from the Ottoman Empire. Likewise, in 1918 the former autonomous Habsburg crownland of Vojvodina proclaimed its secession from Austria-Hungary to unite with Serbia, preceded by the Syrmia region.

The current borders of the country were established following the end of World War II, when Serbia became a federal unit within the Socialist Federal Republic of Yugoslavia.
Serbia became an independent state again in 2006, after Montenegro left the union that formed after the dissolution of Yugoslavia in 1990s.

In February 2008, the parliament of Kosovo unilaterally declared independence from Serbia. Serbia's government, as well as the UN Security Council, have not recognized Kosovo's independence. The response from the international community has been mixed.
Serbia is a member of the United Nations, the Organization for Security and Co-operation in Europe, and the Council of Europe, and is an associate member of the European Union.

General reference 
 Pronunciation: Serbia , officially the Republic of Serbia ( /)
 Common English country name:  Serbia
 Official English country name:  The Republic of Serbia
 Common endonym(s): Srbija – Србија
 Official endonym(s): Republika Srbija – Република Србија
 Adjectival(s): Serbian
 Demonym(s): Serbs, Serbians
 Etymology: Name of Serbia
 International rankings of Serbia
 ISO country codes:  RS, SRB, 688
 ISO region codes:  See ISO 3166-2:RS
 Internet country code top-level domain:  .rs

Geography of Serbia 
Geography of Serbia
 Serbia is: a sovereign state; a landlocked country
 Location:
 Eastern Hemisphere
 Northern Hemisphere
 Eurasia
 Europe
 Southern Europe
 Balkans (also known as "Southeastern Europe")
 Time zone:  Central European Time (UTC+01), Central European Summer Time (UTC+02)
 Extreme points of Serbia
 High:  Velika Rudoka 
 Low:  Iron Gate 
 Land boundaries:  2,026 km (1258 mi)
 352 km
 476 km (295 mi)
 318 km (197 mi)
 302 km (187 mi)
 241 km (149 mi)
 151 km (93 mi)
 203 km (126 mi)
 221 km (137 mi)
 Coastline:  none
 Population of Serbia: 9,527,100 (January 1, 2008)  - 81st most populous country

 Area of Serbia: 88 361 km2
 Atlas of Serbia

Environment of Serbia 

 Climate of Serbia
 Environmental issues in Serbia
 Ecoregions in Serbia
 Ecology of Serbia
 Renewable energy in Serbia
 Geology of Serbia
 Protected areas of Serbia
 Biosphere reserves in Serbia
 National parks of Serbia
 Wildlife of Serbia
 Flora of Serbia
 Fauna of Serbia
 Birds of Serbia
 Mammals of Serbia

Natural geographic features of Serbia 
 Glaciers of Serbia
 Islands of Serbia
 Lakes of Serbia
 Mountains of Serbia
 Hills of Serbia
Hills in Belgrade
 Rivers of Serbia
 Waterfalls of Serbia
 Valleys of Serbia
 World Heritage Sites in Serbia

Regions of Serbia 

Regions of Serbia

Ecoregions of Serbia 

List of ecoregions in Serbia
 Ecoregions in Serbia

Administrative divisions of Serbia 

Administrative divisions of Serbia
 Districts of Serbia
 Municipalities of Serbia

Districts of Serbia 

Districts of Serbia
 Vojvodina 
 Central Serbia

Disputed 

 Kosovo and Metohija

Municipalities of Serbia 

Municipalities of Serbia
 Capital of Serbia: Belgrade
 Cities of Serbia

Demography of Serbia 

Demographics of Serbia

Government and politics of Serbia 

Politics of Serbia
 Form of government:
 Capital of Serbia: Belgrade
 Elections in Serbia
 Political parties in Serbia

Branches of the government of Serbia 

Government of Serbia

Executive branch of the government of Serbia 
 Head of state: President of Serbia, Aleksandar Vučić
 Head of government: Prime Minister of Serbia, Ana Brnabić
 Cabinet of Serbia

Legislative branch of the government of Serbia 

 Parliament of Serbia (unicameral)

Judicial branch of the government of Serbia 
Court system of Serbia
Supreme Court of Serbia

Foreign relations of Serbia 

Foreign relations of Serbia
 Diplomatic missions in Serbia
 Diplomatic missions of Serbia

International organization membership 
The Republic of Serbia is a member of:

Black Sea Economic Cooperation Zone (BSEC)
Central European Initiative (CEI)
Council of Europe (CE)
Euro-Atlantic Partnership Council (EAPC)
European Bank for Reconstruction and Development (EBRD)
European Organization for Nuclear Research (CERN)
Food and Agriculture Organization (FAO)
International Atomic Energy Agency (IAEA)
International Bank for Reconstruction and Development (IBRD)
International Chamber of Commerce (ICC)
International Civil Aviation Organization (ICAO)
International Criminal Court (ICCt)
International Criminal Police Organization (Interpol)
International Development Association (IDA)
International Federation of Red Cross and Red Crescent Societies (IFRCS)
International Finance Corporation (IFC)
International Fund for Agricultural Development (IFAD) (suspended)
International Hydrographic Organization (IHO)
International Labour Organization (ILO)
International Maritime Organization (IMO)
International Mobile Satellite Organization (IMSO)
International Monetary Fund (IMF)
International Olympic Committee (IOC)
International Organization for Migration (IOM)
International Organization for Standardization (ISO)
International Red Cross and Red Crescent Movement (ICRM)
International Telecommunication Union (ITU)
International Telecommunications Satellite Organization (ITSO)

International Trade Union Confederation (ITUC)
Inter-Parliamentary Union (IPU)
Multilateral Investment Guarantee Agency (MIGA)
Nonaligned Movement (NAM) (observer)
Organisation internationale de la Francophonie (OIF) (observer)
Organization for Security and Cooperation in Europe (OSCE)
Organisation for the Prohibition of Chemical Weapons (OPCW)
Organization of American States (OAS) (observer)
Partnership for Peace (PFP)
Permanent Court of Arbitration (PCA)
Southeast European Cooperative Initiative (SECI)
United Nations (UN)
United Nations Conference on Trade and Development (UNCTAD)
United Nations Educational, Scientific, and Cultural Organization (UNESCO)
United Nations High Commissioner for Refugees (UNHCR)
United Nations Industrial Development Organization (UNIDO)
United Nations Mission in Liberia (UNMIL)
United Nations Operation in Cote d'Ivoire (UNOCI)
United Nations Organization Mission in the Democratic Republic of the Congo (MONUC)
Universal Postal Union (UPU)
World Confederation of Labour (WCL)
World Customs Organization (WCO)
World Federation of Trade Unions (WFTU)
World Health Organization (WHO)
World Intellectual Property Organization (WIPO)
World Meteorological Organization (WMO)
World Tourism Organization (UNWTO)
World Trade Organization (WTO) (observer)
World Veterans Federation

Law and order in Serbia 

Law of Serbia
 Capital punishment in Serbia
 Constitution of Serbia
 Crime in Serbia
 Human rights in Serbia
 LGBT rights in Serbia
 Freedom of religion in Serbia
 Law enforcement in Serbia
Terrorism in Serbia

Military of Serbia 

Military of Serbia
 Command
 Commander-in-chief:
 Ministry of Defence of Serbia
 Forces
 Army of Serbia
 Navy of Serbia: None
 Air Force of Serbia
 Special forces of Serbia
 Military history of Serbia
 Military ranks of Serbia'
 List of military conflicts involving Serbia

Local government in Serbia 

Local government in Serbia

History of Serbia 

 Military history of Serbia
 Legal history of Serbia
 Political history of Serbia
 Economical history of Serbia
Serbia in the Middle Ages
History of Ottoman Serbia
History of Serbia (1804–1918)
History of Serbia since 1918

Culture of Serbia 

Culture of Serbia
 Architecture of Serbia
 Cuisine of Serbia
 Festivals in Serbia
 Languages of Serbia
 Media in Serbia
 National symbols of Serbia
 Coat of arms of Serbia
 Flag of Serbia
 National anthem of Serbia
 People of Serbia
 Prostitution in Serbia
 Public holidays in Serbia
 Records of Serbia
 Religion in Serbia
 Christianity in Serbia
 Hinduism in Serbia
 Islam in Serbia
 Judaism in Serbia
 Sikhism in Serbia
 World Heritage Sites in Serbia

Art in Serbia 
 Art in Serbia
 Cinema of Serbia
 Literature of Serbia
 Music of Serbia
 Television in Serbia
 Theatre in Serbia

Sports in Serbia 

Sports in Serbia
 Football in Serbia
 Serbia at the Olympics

Economy and infrastructure of Serbia 

Economy of Serbia
 Economic rank, by nominal GDP (2007): 71st (seventy-first)
 Agriculture in Serbia
 Banking in Serbia
 National Bank of Serbia
 Communications in Serbia
 Internet in Serbia
 Companies of Serbia
Currency of Serbia: Dinar
ISO 4217: RSD
 Energy in Serbia
 Energy policy of Serbia
 Oil industry in Serbia
 Health care in Serbia
 Mining in Serbia
 Serbia Stock Exchange
 Tourism in Serbia
 Transport in Serbia
 Airports in Serbia
 Rail transport in Serbia
 Roads in Serbia
 Water supply and sanitation in Serbia

Education in Serbia 

Education in Serbia

Science in Serbia 
 Astronomy in Serbia

See also 

Serbia
Index of Serbia-related articles

List of international rankings
Member state of the United Nations
Outline of Europe
Outline of Kosovo
Outline of geography

References

Notes

External links

Serbian Government
e-Government Portal of Serbia
President of Serbia
National Assembly of Serbia
Ministry of Foreign Affairs of Serbia
National Tourist Organization of Serbia
National Bank of Serbia
Serbia Investment and Export Promotion Agency
Statistical Office of Serbia
Serbia: CIA World FactBook 2008

Serbia
 1